Loganatha Narayanasamy Government College is the first to be started by the government of Tamil Nadu in the Chengalpattu M.G.R. district, now called Thiruvallur District.

History
Loganatha Narayanaswamy Government College was founded in 1965 by Loganathan and Narayanaswamy, with the support of the government. They had contributed 5 lakh rupees for the construction and land, near the Ponneri railway station on the Thiruvottiyur - Ponneri. The college educates more than 700 students in 14 courses.

Academics 
The college offers courses at undergraduate and postgraduate levels.
 BA   - Tamil
 BA   - Branch I Historical Studies
 BA   - Branch I Political Science
 BA   - Branch XII English
 B.Com- general
 B.Sc - Branch I Mathematics 
 B.Sc - Branch II Physics
 B.Sc - Branch IV Chemistry
 B.Sc - Branch VA Plant Biology and Plant Biotechnology
 B.Sc - Branch XII Computer Science
 MA   - Branch I Historical Studies
 MA   - Branch II Political Science
 M.Sc - Branch Computer Science

References

Arts colleges in India
Education in Tiruvallur district
Educational institutions established in 1965
1965 establishments in Madras State
Colleges affiliated to University of Madras
Universities and colleges in Chennai